The C. Herman and Mary Virginia Terry College of Business is a constituent college of the University of Georgia in Athens, Georgia, United States. The business college offers undergraduate programs, MBA programs, specialized master's programs and doctoral programs. It was founded as the first business school in the American South in 1912. The Terry College MBA Program is often recognized as a top 40 graduate business program and has a selectivity rate of approximately 35%.

The Terry MBA is offered as a full-time degree on campus in Athens, as an MBA for working professionals in Gwinnett County and in the Buckhead district of Atlanta, and as an Executive MBA in  Buckhead.

All of the college's programs are accredited by AACSB International – the Association to Advance Collegiate Schools of Business.

History

"Next to farming, more men enter business than any other occupation; yet there is not an institution [in the] South...that offers a course for such students."
- Joseph Stewart on the need of business education at the University of Georgia in his Annual Report to Chancellor Walter B. Hill (1904)

The Terry College was founded as the "School of Commerce" in 1912 by the state's Board of Regents. The early years of the school were "fragile" as the program struggled to acquire faculty and funding to serve the several students who had declared their intention to pursue the new Bachelor of Science in Commerce degree. The first such degree was awarded in 1915 to Willis Brazeal Sparks.

The school was known as the College of Business Administration from 1940 until 1991, when it was renamed the C. Herman and Mary Virginia Terry College of Business, honoring the late Herman Terry, and his wife, Mary Virginia, who as benefactors have endowed faculty chairs, research fellowships, scholarships, and funded facility upgrades.

Degrees offered
In Athens, the Terry College offers an undergraduate program, four master's degrees (the Full-Time MBA, the Master of Accountancy, the Master of Marketing Research and the Master of Economics) and eight doctoral degree tracks. It offers two online degrees: a Bachelor of Business Administration completion degree in general business and a Master of Internet Technology degree. The Terry College also offers Executive MBA and Professional MBA programs at the Terry Executive Education Center in Atlanta.

Full-time MBA

The Terry Full-Time MBA Program is currently only offered at the Athens campus. The full-time program is offered to any student regardless of previous bachelor's degree majors. The program is four semesters long, fall and spring semesters only. Students take core curriculum classes in their first year of the MBA Program, including leadership, ethics, accounting, economics, business law, MIS, and finance. They may take one elective course in the second semester of their first year. The second year is focused entirely upon elective courses to round out the business experience and fundamental business curriculum. MBA students are encouraged to complete an internship in their summer semester between their first and second year.

The MBA Career Management Center offers assistance with internships, job placement, career coaching and networking events.

Certificates

Leadership

The Institute for Leadership Advancement (ILA) in the Terry College of Business was established in 2001. ILA provides students with self-assessments, coaching/mentoring, action learning and feedback focused on the development of greater emotional competence. Two undergraduate leadership programs form the centerpiece of ILA  programming: the Leonard Leadership Scholars Program (for Terry College majors) and the Leadership Fellows Program (for students in any UGA major). Completion of either program earns the student a certificate in Personal and Organizational Leadership.

ILA hosts the Terry Leadership Speaker Series, which brings well-known leaders from a variety of organizations to the Terry College of Business. In these student-oriented forums, leaders are asked to discuss their leadership styles and experiences.

Music Business

The Music Business Certificate Program was launched in January 2006 as a response to the growing music and entertainment industry in the state of Georgia. In starting the program, former director Bruce Burch often said Atlanta is now recognized as the "fourth music center" in the country behind New York, Los Angeles, and Nashville, and is growing rapidly as a hotbed for music and film production. Since August 2010, the program has been under the leadership of Athens-based musician and producer/engineer David Barbe.

Students can earn an interdisciplinary certificate in music business by receiving a hands-on education about subjects like music and business fundamentals, copyright issues, creative content, artist management and production and technology. Music and entertainment industry executives are brought in from across the country to speak to classes, providing not only "real world" perspective, but also networking opportunities. Only 100 students are annually enrolled in the program.

Actuarial Science
The Actuarial Science Certificate Program is designed to prepare students for an actuarial career. Actuaries apply mathematical models to assess the financial cost of uncertainty. There is a high demand for actuaries across all industries. This certificate program is open to all undergraduate students currently enrolled at UGA.

Legal Studies
This certificate program prepares students for the complex legal environment of business and helps them also to gauge their interest in pursuing a law degree. To obtain the certificate students must complete 15 course hours with a minimum grade of C (2.00) in those courses. A number of pre-requisite courses are necessary before this program may be undertaken.

Entrepreneurship

Terry Entrepreneurship is housed in the department of MIS and focuses on the four key tasks of entrepreneurship: opportunity identification, resource acquisition and deployment, goal setting and strategy formulation, and implementation. This highly active concentration hosts a multitude of seminars and events on and off the UGA campus, including "UGA's Next Top Entrepreneur Competition" and "UGA Startups."

UGA's Next Top Entrepreneur was dubbed the "American Idol" of business plan competitions. Both a competition and a seminar series lasting the full academic year, it is open to all UGA students. Competitors participate in a series of interactive seminars and individual coaching sessions focused on starting a business. The first year of competition (2008–09) resulted in eight businesses being launched, $212,000 of initial revenue, and procurement of angel funding.

The UGA Startups series was designed for entrepreneurs to have access to some of the most seasoned entrepreneurs in the Southeast. Topics include innovation, funding, opportunity analysis, business communications, purchasing businesses, and franchising. UGA Startups events are held at the Terry Executive Education Center.

Executive programs

Terry Executive Programs offer business professionals value-added education with certification and development programs in areas such as financial planning certification, human resources leadership, project management, and business analysis.

Selig Center for Economic Growth

Dedicated in December 1990, the Selig Center improves upon its predecessor, the Division of Research, which was established in the late 1940s.

Through its range of projects — major economic impact studies, economic forecasts, publications, information services, and data products — the center's efforts help to guide business decisions and public policy directions. In doing so, the Selig Center has become the Terry College of Business's most visible public service unit.

Georgia Economic Outlook Series
Each year the Terry College hosts the Georgia Economic Outlook series in 12 cities throughout the state. The series provides more than 3,000 business and government leaders the foundation to make informed decisions based on economic data from the Selig Center for Economic Growth.

Rankings

Undergraduate programs

 Risk Management and Insurance 

No. 1 by U.S. News & World Report

 Real Estate 

No. 5 by U.S. News & World Report

 Management Information Systems (MIS) 

No. 8 by U.S. News & World Report

 Accounting 

No. 11 by Public Accounting Report and No. 12 by U.S. News & World Report

Graduate programs

 Accounting (Master's) 

No. 9 by Public Accounting Report

Accounting (PhD)

No. 13 by Public Accounting Report

Economics (PhD)

No. 55 by U.S. News & World Report

Executive MBA

No. 14 by Fortune

Full-time MBA

No. 39 by U.S. News & World Report

Professional MBA

No. 44 by U.S. News & World Report

Campuses

Athens

The Terry College of Business was located on the historic North Campus of the University of Georgia in three buildings: Brooks Hall, Sanford Hall, and Caldwell Hall. Brooks Hall, designed by prominent architect Neel Reid, was built in 1928. It was known as the Commerce-Journalism Building before being renamed in 1974 for Robert Preston Brooks, the college's first dean. Funded through private gifts and dedicated in 1997, Sanford Hall was added. Caldwell Hall was built in 1981. 

In 2014, the university began construction of the Business Learning Community campus to house the entirety of the Terry College of Business in one location on North Campus. The 306,000-square-foot six building campus provides needed additional adaptable space and technology for teaching and teamwork. Phase I, known as Correll Hall, opened for classes in Fall 2015. It houses classrooms for graduate programs, a graduate commons, a business innovation lab, multiple project team rooms, interview suites, the dean's office, and a café. Phase II was completed in 2017 and features two large auditoriums, 12 classrooms, a trading room, a behavioral lab, and an undergraduate commons with a south-facing veranda. Phase III was completed in 2019 and comprised the last two buildings in the Terry Business Learning Community housing 10 classrooms, staff offices, and conference rooms. Beyond the Community is Studio 225, on West Broad Street in downtown Athens, that is home to the Entrepreneurship Program. The center is part of the university's Innovation District.

Atlanta

The Terry College of Business has three satellite campuses located in Gwinnett, Griffin, and Atlanta, Georgia.

The Terry College's "home away from home" in Atlanta is the Terry Executive Education Center, located in the Buckhead area.

The Executive and Professional MBA programs are offered at the center in addition to non-degree programs such as the executive program for Financial Planning Certification. The center also acts as a focal point and meeting place for Terry students, alumni, faculty, and staff to interact with Atlanta's business community. Designed and constructed with an eye toward maximizing each student's educational experience, the center features tiered executive classrooms, conference rooms, break-out meeting spaces and interview suites. Also included is office space for faculty and staff.

The University of Georgia's degree programs in Gwinnett, including the Terry Professional MBA program, are located in the Intellicenter Building in Lawrenceville.

Notable alumni
 Daniel P. Amos, BBA 1973 – chairman and CEO of Aflac.
 M. Michele Burns, BBA 1979, M.Acc. 1980 — chairman and CEO of Mercer and on the boards of directors a number of major American companies including Cisco Systems, Wal-Mart, and Goldman Sachs
 Gary C. Butler, MBA 1970 – president and CEO of Automatic Data Processing
 Bryan Calhoun, BBA 1992 – vice president of new media and external affairs at SoundExchange
 Saxby Chambliss, BBA 1966 – U.S. Senator 2003–2015
 A.D. "Pete" Correll, BBA 1963 – chairman emeritus of Georgia-Pacific and director of SunTrust Bank, Mirant and Norfolk Southern
 Thomas G. Cousins, BBA 1952 – real estate developer, former pro sports franchise owner, philanthropist, and a founder (with Warren Buffett and Julian Robertson) of Purpose Built Communities  
 Phil Gramm, BBA 1964, PhD 1967 – economist, U.S. Representative (1978–1985), and U.S. Senator (1985–2002) from Texas
 Frank Hanna III, BBA 1983, JD 1986 – entrepreneur, merchant banker, philanthropist, and Knight of the Grand Cross of the Order of St. Gregory the Great
 Mason Hawkins, MBA 1971 – chairman and CEO of Southeastern Asset Management Inc.
 Dave Haywood, BBA 2004 - musician and a founder of the Lady Antebellum band
 Johnny Isakson, BBA 1966 – U.S. Senator since 2005
 M. Douglas Ivester, BBA 1969 – retired chairman and CEO of the Coca-Cola Company
 Steve C. Jones, BBA 1978, JD 1987 – appointed in 2011 as judge to the U.S. District Court
 Charles Kelley, BBA 2004 - musician and a founder of the Lady Antebellum band
 Darryl D. McDonald, BBA 1981 – executive vice president of applications and business development and chief marketing officer of Teradata
 Robert D. McTeer, BBA 1963, PhD 1971 – president of the Federal Reserve Bank of Dallas, 1991–2005
 Bernard B. Ramsey, BSC 1937 – senior vice president and chair of the executive committee of Merrill Lynch
 Charles S. Sanford Jr., BBA 1958 - was Chairman of the Board and Chief Executive Officer of Bankers Trust
 Frank W. "Sonny" Seiler, BBA 1956, JD 1957 – trial attorney; had a leading role in the book and movie Midnight in the Garden of Good and Evil (New York Times Best-Seller that remains the longest-standing New York Times Best-Seller); owner of the line of white English Bulldogs that have served as UGA's mascots 
 Thomas J. Stanley, PhD 1969 - business theorist, writer, and university business professor who was the author and co-author of several award-winning books on America's wealthy including the New York Times’ best sellers The Millionaire Next Door and The Millionaire Mind
 Sheila Taormina, BBA 1992, MBA 1994 – four-time U.S. Olympian in swimming, triathlon and modern pentathlon

See also
 List of United States business school rankings
 List of business schools in the United States

References

External links
 
 University of Georgia
 Terry College of Business MBA program

Colleges and schools of the University of Georgia
Business schools in Georgia (U.S. state)
Educational institutions established in 1912
1912 establishments in Georgia (U.S. state)